Lucía García Córdoba (born 14 July 1998) is a Spanish professional footballer who plays as a forward for Manchester United of the English Women's Super League and the Spain national team.

Early life
García was the only female in a set of quadruplets. She was born at Cruces University Hospital in Barakaldo, Basque Country, 180 miles from her hometown of Aller, Asturias, after her mother decided on a specialist hospital due to the increased risk of a multiple birth. They were born prematurely after seven months and initially placed into incubators. Growing up she has stated that none of her brothers were particularly interested in football, and she played on the street as the village of 200 inhabitants had no football field. She played one year of futsal in nearby Cabañaquinta before taking up athletics and tennis for two years. When she was 13 years old, a physical education teacher suggested García try out for the youth team at Oviedo Moderno.

Club career

Oviedo Moderno
On 8 September 2013, García made her senior debut for newly-promoted first division team Oviedo Moderno at the age of 15. She appeared as a 67th-minute substitute for Irene del Río on the opening day of the 2013–14 Primera División as Oviedo lost 2–1 to Valencia. In her debut season she scored eight goals in 26 league appearances as Oviedo finished 13th of 16 teams. She scored another eight goals in 18 appearances the following season as the team finished 10th, their best finish since 2003. In her third season, García scored three times in 19 games as Oviedo finished 15th and were relegated.

Athletic Bilbao
Following Oviedo's relegation at the end of the 2015–16 season, García remained in the Primera División and signed for reigning champions Athletic Bilbao in June 2016 – under their self-imposed player restrictions, the circumstances of her birth made her eligible to play for the all-Basque club. She made her debut on 3 September 2016, starting in the opening game of the season and scored in the 2–0 win over Fundación Albacete. She made her Champions League debut during the season, starting in a 2–1 win over reigning Danish Women's League champions Fortuna Hjørring in the round of 32 first leg.

After scoring five and seven goals in her first two seasons respectively, García had a breakout season during 2018–19 season, scoring 13 goals in 22 matches, the most on the team and joint-8th best in the league. She scored her first career hat-trick on 13 March 2019 in a 4–3 league win over Logroño. Despite an injury impacted 2019–20 season, García made 18 league appearances, scoring nine goals. The following season she made 29 league appearances and scored a career-high 16 goals but, despite her own personal success, Athletic finished 11th in the 2020–21 Primera División, lower than the club's previous worst finishing position of 5th since joining the Primera División in 2002. In her final season, García scored a team-leading 12 league goals as the team improved to 7th. In six seasons, she scored 63 goals in 161 appearances in all competitions to help the club achieve a highest league finish of third in 2017–18, also reaching the Copa de la Reina semi-finals twice. In 2022, she elected not to renew her contract at Athletic (as did teammate and fellow Spanish international Ainhoa Moraza).

Manchester United
On 25 July 2022, García signed a two-year contract with English Women's Super League club Manchester United.

International career

Youth
As a youth, García represented Spain at under-17, under-19 and under-20 level including at four major youth tournaments: 2015 UEFA Women's Under-17 Championship, two editions of the UEFA Women's Under-19 Championship (2016 and 2017), and two FIFA U-20 Women's World Cup tournaments (2016 and 2018).

Spain won the 2015 UEFA Women's Under-17 Championship, beating Switzerland 5–2 in the final. García started all five games in the tournament and finished second in the golden boot race with five goals, one behind Stefanie Sanders of Germany.

The following year she represented Spain at the 2016 UEFA Women's Under-19 Championship in Slovakia as they finished as runners-up, losing to France 2–1 in the final. She scored four goals in five appearances, third behind golden boot winner Marie-Antoinette Katoto and runner-up Jill Roord. She was recalled to the squad later in the year for the 2016 FIFA U-20 Women's World Cup in Papua New Guinea, playing in all four games and scoring three goals: two in a group stage victory over Canada and another in a 3–2 defeat after extra-time to North Korea in the quarter-finals. She retained her place with the under-19s in 2017 and was selected by Pedro López to go the 2017 UEFA Women's Under-19 Championship. Spain won the tournament with a stoppage time goal from Patricia Guijarro against France. García started every game in the tournament and scored twice, second on the team behind Guijarro's five goals although she was not one of the seven Spanish players selected to the team of the tournament. The result also qualified Spain for the 2018 FIFA U-20 Women's World Cup. She made two appearances, both in the group stage, and scored once in a 2–2 draw with United States. Spain finished as runners-up, losing 3–1 to Japan in the final.

Senior
García earned her first senior international call-up for Spain for the 2018 Cyprus Women's Cup. She was given her debut during the tournament by Jorge Vilda on 2 March 2018, as a 58th-minute substitute for Jennifer Hermoso in a 0–0 draw with Belgium. She made a further two appearances against the Czech Republic and then in the final against Italy as Spain won the tournament.

In 2019, she was the youngest player named in the Spain squad for the 2019 FIFA Women's World Cup aged 20. García scored her first senior international goal on 8 June 2019, the third in Spain's 3–1 comeback win against South Africa in their opening group game to secure Spain's first ever win at a FIFA Women's World Cup.

In 2020, García scored four goals in four appearances for Spain. She scored a brace against Japan in a 3–1 victory at the 2020 SheBelieves Cup and another brace against Moldova during UEFA Women's Euro 2022 qualifying as Spain won 9–0.

In 2022, García was named to the squad for UEFA Women's Euro 2022, her second successive major tournament. With Jennifer Hermoso ruled out of the tournament through injury, García scored twice in a warm-up game against Australia before starting all three group games, scoring in a 4–1 win over Finland. She was an unused substitute for the quarter-final match against England as Spain lost 2–1 in extra-time.

Career statistics

Club summary
.

International summary
Statistics accurate as of match played 2 September 2022

International goals

Scores and results list Spain's goal tally first, score column indicates score after each García goal.

Honours
International
Youth
UEFA Women's Under-17 Championship: 2015
UEFA Women's Under-19 Championship: 2017
FIFA U-20 Women's World Cup runner-up: 2018

Senior
 Cyprus Cup: 2018

Notes

References

External links

Lucía Garcia at Liga de Fútbol Profesional

1998 births
Living people
Women's association football forwards
Spanish women's footballers
Footballers from Barakaldo
Footballers from Asturias
People from Aller, Asturias
Quadruplets
Twin sportspeople
Spanish twins 
Spain women's international footballers
Real Oviedo (women) players
Athletic Club Femenino players
Manchester United W.F.C. players
Primera División (women) players
Spanish expatriate women's footballers
Spanish expatriate sportspeople in England
Expatriate women's footballers in England
2019 FIFA Women's World Cup players
UEFA Women's Euro 2022 players
Spain women's youth international footballers